Richardson Wildland Park is a wildland provincial park in the Regional Municipality of Wood Buffalo, northern Alberta, Canada. Two previous parks, Maybelle River Wildland Provincial Park and Richardson River Dunes Wildland Provincial Park, established in 1998, were disestablished on 14 May 2018 and the area was incorporated into Richardson Wildland Park. The park is within the Lower Athabasca Region Land Use Framework and managed within the Lower Athabasca Regional Plan.

Location
The park is located near the far northeast corner of the province. It is south of Lake Athabasca and east of the Athabasca River which forms the border with Wood Buffalo National Park. To the southwest and south, the park abuts Kitaskino Nuwenëné Wildland Provincial Park and to the southeast is Marguerite River Wildland Provincial Park. The park surrounds the Athabasca Dunes Ecological Reserve. Four-wheel drive vehicles are recommended year-round as road conditions may be poor.

Ecology 
The park contains the Athabasca Plain and Peace Athabasca Delta Subregions of the Boreal Forest Natural Region. The Boreal Forest Natural Region is characterized by short summers and long, cold winters. It contains vast deciduous, mixedwood, and coniferous forests interspersed with extensive Wetlands. The Athabasca Plain Natural Subregion is dominated by extensive jack pine forests. It is made up of dry, sandy plains, dune fields, and gravel-cored hills. The largest active dune system in Alberta is found in this subregion. The Peace-Athabasca Delta is the largest boreal delta in the world. It is one of the most important nesting and staging areas for waterfowl in North America and is recognized under the Ramsar Convention as an internationally important wetland.

Activities 
As there are no developed facilities in the park, only wildlife viewing, random backcountry camping, and backcountry hiking are available. Snowmobiles and off highway vehicles are permitted in the park. Hunting and fishing are allowed with permits.

See also 
 List of provincial parks in Alberta
 List of Canadian provincial parks

References

External links
 
 

Parks in Alberta
Regional Municipality of Wood Buffalo